Alen Horvat (born 13 September 1973) is a Croatian professional football manager and former player.

During the period in Al-Nassr FC in January 2021, he won Saudi Super Cup and was also named as Coach of the Month in Saudi League.

Career
Horvat played for the Croatia national team and was one of the youngest captain in history of HNK Rijeka. He played his professional debut for HNK Rijeka when he was eighteen years old. Also when he started his coaching career, he was one of the youngest coaches in HNK Rijeka. 
After a successful career in Croatia, Horvat continues his career in Saudi Arabia and the UAE. In January 2021 with Al Nassr FC he won the Saudi Super Cup. 

On 21 October 2021, Horvat was appointed as manager of Al-Batin. He was sacked on 19 February 2023.

Statistics

Player

Manager

Honours

Manager
Al-Nassr
Saudi Super Cup: 2020

Individual
Saudi Professional League Manager of the Month: January 2021

References

External links

1973 births
Living people
Footballers from Rijeka
Association football midfielders
Croatian footballers
Croatia under-21 international footballers
HNK Rijeka players
HNK Segesta players
HNK Orijent players
NK Novalja players
NK Pomorac 1921 players
Croatian Football League players
Croatian football managers
HNK Rijeka managers
NK Hrvatski Dragovoljac managers
NK Marsonia managers
Al-Ain FC (Saudi Arabia) managers
Khaleej FC managers
Al Nassr FC managers
Al Batin FC managers
Saudi First Division League managers
Saudi Professional League managers
Croatian expatriate football managers
Croatian expatriate sportspeople in the United Arab Emirates
Expatriate football managers in Saudi Arabia
Croatian expatriate sportspeople in Saudi Arabia
HNK Rijeka non-playing staff